The ABA League Second Division, also ABA League 2, is the 2nd-tier men's basketball division of the ABA League system. It is run by the ABA League JTD. It is a regional competition between men's professional clubs from six countries: Bosnia and Herzegovina, Croatia, Montenegro, North Macedonia, Serbia, and Slovenia.

History 
The ABA League Assembly, held on 24 July 2017, in Belgrade, Serbia, decided to organize the ABA League Second Division with 12 participants. Based on the results in the national championships and by taking into account which clubs have sent applications for participation in the ABA League Second Division, these teams will play in the inaugural season of the ABA League Second Division.

Teams from Bosnia and Herzegovina, Croatia, Montenegro, North Macedonia, Serbia, and Slovenia previously played similar second-tier competition called First B Federal League when they were part of SFR Yugoslavia. The First B Federal League was played for 11 seasons from 1980 to 1991.

On 12 March 2020, the ABA League Assembly temporarily suspended the 2019–20 season due to the COVID-19 pandemic. On 27 May 2020, the ABA League Assembly canceled definitely the season due to the COVID-19 pandemic. On 29 June 2020, the Assembly decided to extend the number of clubs from 12 to 14 until the 2024–25 season.

Seasons

First Division promotion and relegation 
The champions of the Second Division are promoted to a following Adriatic League First Division season, while the last-placed team in the First Division are relegated to a following season of the Second Division. Also, as of the 2018–19 season, the 11th placed team of the ABA League First Division and the 2nd placed team of the Second Division, will play in the Qualifiers for a spot in the First Division for the following season.

Current clubs

All-time participants 
The following is a list of clubs that have played in the Second Division, at any time, since its formation in 2017, to the current season.

Key

List of participants 
Note: Statistics are correct through the end of the 2022–23 regular season.

The 2019–20 season was canceled due to COVID-19 pandemic in Europe.

See also
 Yugoslav First B Federal League
 ABA League Supercup

Notes

References

External links
 
 Adriatic League page at Eurobasket.com

ABA League
2017 establishments in Europe
Second level basketball leagues in Europe
Sports leagues established in 2017
Multi-national basketball leagues in Europe